Maktoum or maktoom, also known as katem, is a traditional Arabic unpitched percussion instrument.  A large round bass drum, it is played while held between knees.

References

Arabic musical instruments
Hand drums
Drums
Unpitched percussion instruments